The Hunter 33-2, also referred to as the Hunter 33-2004, is an American sailboat, that was designed by Glenn Henderson and first built in 2004.

The design was marketed as the Hunter 33, but is referred to as the Hunter 33-2004 or 33-2, to differentiate it from the other models that Hunter Marine has marketed under the same name, including the 1977 Hunter 33 and the 2012 Hunter E33, which remained in production in 2018 as the Marlow-Hunter 33.

Production
The design was built by Hunter Marine in the United States between 2004 and 2012, but it is now out of production.

Design

The Hunter 33-2 is a small recreational keelboat, built predominantly of fiberglass. The hull has a solid fiberglass monolithic bottom, with sandwich sides. The deck is a balsa and polyester fiberglass sandwich, with Kevlar reinforcing.

The design has a fractional sloop B&R rig, a plumb stem, a walk-through reverse transom, an internally-mounted spade-type rudder controlled by a wheel and a fixed fin keel or optional wing keel. The mast is deck-stepped and made from aluminum. A mast-furling mainsail was an option. With the fin keel it displaces  and carries  of ballast. With the wing keel it displaces  and carries  of cast iron ballast. The below decks headroom is 

A  engine was a factory option.

See also
List of sailing boat types

Related development
Marlow-Hunter 33

Similar sailboats
Abbott 33
C&C 3/4 Ton
C&C 33
C&C 101
C&C SR 33
CS 33
Endeavour 33
Hunter 33
Hunter 33.5
Hunter 333
Hunter 336
Hunter 340
Mirage 33
Moorings 335
Nonsuch 33
Tanzer 10
Viking 33

References

External links

Official brochure

Keelboats
2000s sailboat type designs
Sailing yachts
Sailboat type designs by Glenn Henderson
Sailboat types built by Hunter Marine